The Bo Palace (Italian: Palazzo del Bo), is the historical seat of University of Padua since 1493, It is still home to the Rectorate and the School of Law. It is also home to the oldest anatomical theatre in the world.

Palaces in Padua
Renaissance architecture in Padua